The 2016–17 FC Metz season was the 83rd professional season of the club since its creation in 1932.

Current squad

Transfers 

In:

Out:

Statistics

Top scorers

Competitions

Ligue 1

League table

Results summary

Results by round

Matches

Coupe de France

Coupe de la Ligue

References

Metz
FC Metz seasons